Oregon's 21st Senate district comprises parts of Clackamas and Multnomah counties, including parts of southeast Portland, as well as Milwaukie and Oak Grove. It is currently represented by Democrat Kathleen Taylor of Portland.

List of members representing the districts

Election results
District boundaries have changed over time, therefore, senators before 2013 may not represent the same constituency as today. From 1993 until 2003, the district covered parts of the Eugene metropolitan area, and from 2003 until 2013 it covered a slightly different area in the southern Portland metropolitan area.

In 2012, local businessman Cliff Hutchison announced that he would challenge incumbent Senator Diane Rosenbaum.

In 2016, three candidates ran to replace the retiring Rosenbaum. Democratic State Representative Kathleen Taylor; Oregon Progressive Party candidate James Ofsink, a health analyst; and accountant Josh Howard running on the Libertarian ticket. Ofsink ran as a more progressive alternative to Taylor while Howard represented both Libertarians and Republicans in the district.

References

21
Clackamas County, Oregon
Multnomah County, Oregon